The Bondage of the Bush is a 1913 Australian silent film starring, written, produced and directed by Charles Woods. It is considered a lost film. It screened widely in country areas.

Plot
The film was divided into the following chapters:
the great race
a leap for life
horse and man precipitated to raging torrents below
fight with the waters
the dash for liberty
the struggle on the cliffs
the black boy's revenge

Cast
D.R. Rivenall as Dan Romer
Charles Woods as Gee-Bung
Wilton Power as Wilfred Granger
Jeff Williams as James Bramley
Alfred Bristow as Parson Bramley
Gertrude Darley as Monda Bramley
E.W. Newman
H. Ward
H.N. Gannan
E.L. Betts
J. Darley
G. Filmer as Sergeant Jones
J. Hamilton as Trooper Wallace

References

External links
 

Australian black-and-white films
1913 films
1913 drama films
Australian drama films
Australian silent feature films
Lost Australian films
1913 lost films
Lost drama films
Silent drama films
1910s English-language films